Hänninen is a Finnish surname. Notable people with the surname include:

Elina Hänninen, Finnish figure skater
Hannu-Pekka Hänninen (born 1952), Finnish sports commentator who works for Finland's National Broadcasting Company YLE
Harri Hänninen (born 1963), retired Finnish long-distance runner who specialized in the marathon
Janne Hänninen (born 1975), former Finnish speedskater who specialised on the shorter distances
Juho Hänninen (born 1981), Finnish rally driver
Kauko Hänninen (1930–2013), Finnish rower
Kirsi Hänninen (born 1976), Finnish female ice hockey player
Nanna Hänninen (born 1973), photographic artist
Olavi Hänninen (1920–1992), Finnish designer
Osmo Hänninen (born 1939), Finnish scientist and physiologist
Veikko Hänninen (1929–1981), Finnish chess master and writer

Finnish-language surnames